The 2008 Tunis Open was a 2008 ATP Challenger Series men's tennis tournament played on outdoor clay courts and held from 28 April through 4 May 2008. Thomaz Bellucci won the singles tournament.

Champions

Singles

 Thomaz Bellucci defeated  Dušan Vemić, 6–2, 6–4

Doubles

  Thomaz Bellucci /  Bruno Soares defeated  Jean-Claude Scherrer /  Nicolas Tourte, 6–3, 6–4

External links
 International Tennis Federation (ITF) – tournament edition details

 
Tunis Open
2008 ATP Challenger Series